Luchacovirus is a subgenus of viruses in the genus Alphacoronavirus, consisting of a single species, Lucheng Rn rat coronavirus.

References

Virus subgenera
Alphacoronaviruses